Tyrone Thompson, (born July 1, 1967) better known as Papa San, is a Jamaican reggae, dancehall and gospel singer.

Biography 

Born in 1967 in Kingston, Jamaica, he was raised by his Rastafarian grandmother and began performing with sound systems (including Stereophonic the Bionic, Black Scorpio and Creation) in the late 1970s. He won the Tastee Talent contest in 1981. He went on to become one of the major dancehall artists of the late 1980s and 1990s, with hits such as "Animal Party, I will survive, style and fashion, Legal Rights & Round table talk feat. Lady G & Maddy Maddy Cry".

His brother and fellow deejay Dirtsman was murdered in 1993. In the three years that followed, his sister was killed in a motorcycle accident, his cousin was killed by police, and he himself had legal problems after being arrested on weapons charges. He turned to Christianity in 1997. This is also reflected in his style, as he started off as a true dancehall deejay, later adopting traits of Gospel and Christian music.

Papa San sponsors a concert known as Papa San and Friends, to raise funds for orphanages in rural Jamaica. Since becoming a Christian, he has continued to produce his roots reggae sound, but with the message of Christ to the beat instead of his previously popular secular music.

He has six children and lives in Weston, Florida with five of them and his wife, Debbie Thompson. In 2011, Papa San and his wife, having been ordained ministers of the Gospel, were launched into pastoral ministry and started Our Fathers Kingdom International Ministries.

In 2013, Papa San featured on Church Clothes, Vol 2 by Christian Hip Hop artist Lecrae, with Andy Mineo, on the song "The Fever". His album One Blood topped the Billboard Reggae Albums Chart in February 2014.

Discography
 1986 Party Animal (Scar Face Music)
 1986 Papa San Meets Anthony Redrose (Weed Beat)
 1989 Style & Fashion (Pow Wow)
 1989 System (Pow Wow)
 1990 Reggae Dance Hall (Rohit)
 1991 Fire Inna Dancehall (King Dragon)
 1991 Strange (Pow Wow)
 1992 Pray for Them (Sonic Sounds)
 1992 Rough Cut (Pow Wow)
 1993 In Action (Pow Wow)
 1993 Pray Fi Dem (RAS)
 1995 No Place Like Home (VP)
 1996 Gi Mi Di Loving (Melodie)
 1999 Victory (Interscope)
 2003 God & I (Gospo Centric)
 2005 Real and Personal (Gospocentric)
 2008 Higher Heights (Beloved Records)
 unknown Three The Hard Way (World Enterprise)
 2012 My Story (Beloved)
 2014 One Blood

References

External links

 [ Papa San] at Allmusic

Converts to Christianity
Living people
1967 births
Musicians from Kingston, Jamaica
Jamaican male singers
Jamaican gospel singers
People from Spanish Town
Former Rastafarians
VP Records artists